Ahmad Khatab Salim or Ahmad Kharab Salim (born Albert Atkinson) (July 28, 1922 – January 1, 2003) was an American jazz composer, and arranger.

Biography
Salim attended DuSable High School with Bennie Green, Dorothy Donegan and Gene Ammons and played alto saxophone in King Kolax's band from 1938 to 1939 before working with Jimmy Raschel and Tiny Bradshaw. He stopped playing after a jaw injury in 1943 and arranged music for the big bands of Lucky Millinder, Cab Calloway, Jimmy Lunceford, Lionel Hampton and Count Basie who recorded his composition "Normania" in 1949, and recorded it again in 1952 as "Blee Blop Blues". Salim left music for a career in real estate from 1949 to 1956 but returned to write and arrange Latin jazz for Tito Puente, Machito, Dizzy Gillespie and others. Salim released three albums under his leadership on Savoy Records in the late 1950s and recorded a further album for Prestige Records in 1964.

Salim died on January 1, 2003, aged 80.

Discography

As leader
 Flute Suite (Savoy, 1957) with Frank Wess and Herbie Mann
 Stable Mates (Savoy, 1957) split album with Yusef Lateef
 Pretty for the People (Savoy, 1957)
 Blues Suite (Savoy, 1958)
 Afro-Soul/Drum Orgy (Prestige, 1965)

As arranger/composer
with Gene Ammons
Jug Sessions (EmArcy, 1947 [1976])  
With Count Basie
Basie Jazz (Clef, 1952 [1954])
Basie in London (Verve, 1956)
Count Basie at Newport (Verve, 1957)
Basie at Birdland (Roulette, 1961)
With Dizzy Gillespie
World Statesman (Norgran, 1956)
Dizzy Gillespie at Newport (Verve, 1957)
With Illinois Jacquet
Groovin' with Jacquet (Clef, 1951-53 [1956])
With Machito
Kenya (Roulette, 1957)
With Herbie Mann
Salute to the Flute (Epic, 1957)
Flute, Brass, Vibes and Percussion (Verve, 1960)
With Phineas Newborn, Jr.
Phineas Newborn, Jr. Plays Harold Arlen's Music from Jamaica (RCA Victor, 1957)
With Tito Puente
Puente Goes Jazz (RCA, 1956)
Herman's Heat & Puente's Beat! (Everest, 1958) with Woody Herman

See also
 List of jazz arrangers

References

1922 births
2003 deaths
American jazz composers
American male jazz composers
Musicians from Chicago
Prestige Records artists
Savoy Records artists
African-American Muslims
Converts to Islam
Jazz musicians from Illinois